The Central (Macau Ferry) Bus Terminus is a major bus terminus located in Sheung Wan, Central and Western District, Hong Kong, next to the Hong Kong–Macau Ferry Terminal. It is one of the largest open-air bus terminus in Hong Kong and is home to a large variety of cross-harbour tunnel bus routes towards points in Kowloon and the New Territories, making the terminus one of the most important transport interchanges in Hong Kong.

Facilities 
Regulators' kiosks for CTB and NWFB are located next to the exit of the terminus. Also, a bus captains' rest kiosk is also set up at the berth for Route 788.

Feeder transport 
MTR Island line Sheung Wan station Exit D

References
 Hong Kong Guidebook 1981, published by Universal Publications
 Public Transport Atlas 4th edition, published by Universal Publications
 The Development of Hong Kong Island Bus Routes in the 20th Century by Stanley Yung, published by BSI Hobbies
 中環（港澳碼頭）巴士總站及急庇利街總站

External links

Terminus Information on Citybus/NWFB Website

Sheung Wan